Local Route 23 Cheonan–Seoul Line is a local route of South Korea that connecting, Cheonan, South Chungcheong Province to Mapo District, Seoul.

History
The route was originally planned as part of an extension of National Route 23 from Cheonan to Munsan, but due to a lack of funding, the route was never upgraded and was designated as a state-funded local route on 19 July 1996 running from Cheonan to Paju, replacing Local Route 315. On 17 November 2008, the section from Seoul to Paju was upgraded to National Route 77, shortening Route 23 to its current configuration.

Stopovers
 South Chungcheong Province
 Cheonan
 Gyeonggi Province
 Anseong
 South Chungcheong Province
 Cheonan
 Gyeonggi Province
 Anseong - Yongin - Hwaseong - Yongin - Seongnam
 Seoul
 Gangnam District - Gwangjin District - Seongdong District - Yongsan District - Mapo District

Major intersections 

 (■): Motorway
IS: Intersection, IC: Interchange

South Chungcheong Province

Gyeonggi Province

Seoul

See also 
 Roads and expressways in South Korea
 Transportation in South Korea

References

External links 
 MOLIT South Korean Government Transport Department

23
Roads in South Chungcheong
Roads in Gyeonggi
Roads in Seoul